The 2015 Bournemouth Borough Council election took place on 7 May 2015 to elect members of Bournemouth Borough Council in England. This was on the same day as other local elections.

In June 2015, a legal challenge was submitted challenging the result in the Kinson South ward.

Composition of council seats before election

References

2015 English local elections
May 2015 events in the United Kingdom
2015
2010s in Dorset